Bradley Lorne Brown (born December 27, 1975) is a Canadian former professional ice hockey defenceman.

Playing career
As a youth, Brown played in the 1989 Quebec International Pee-Wee Hockey Tournament with a minor ice hockey team from Mississauga.

Brown played junior hockey with the North Bay Centennials and Barrie Colts in the Ontario Hockey League. He received the OHL Humanitarian of the Year in 1994–95. Brown was drafted in the first round, 18th overall, by the Montreal Canadiens in the 1994 NHL Entry Draft.  he made his professional debut in the 1995–96 season, finishing out the year with the Fredericton Canadiens of the AHL.

A defensive defenseman, Brown made his NHL debut the following year in the 1996–97 season with the Montreal Canadiens on November 1, 1996, against the Boston Bruins. Playing mostly for the Fredericton in the next two years Brown's career was established after he was traded by the Canadiens, along with Jocelyn Thibault and Dave Manson, to the Chicago Blackhawks for Jeff Hackett, Eric Weinrich, and Alain Nasreddine on November 16, 1998.

Brown played the next two seasons as a fixture on the Blackhawks defense. Prior to the 2000–01 season, Brown was traded by the Blackhawks along with Michal Grosek to the New York Rangers on October 5, 2000.

On July 31, 2001, Brown was signed as a free agent by the Minnesota Wild. Brown was an integral part of the Wild's defense until the end of the 2003–04 season when he was traded to the Buffalo Sabres of a fourth round pick on March 8, 2004.

After the 2004 NHL Lockout, Brown was signed by the Toronto Maple Leafs on September 10, 2005. Brown however struggled with form and never played for the Leafs, expect for preseason games. Rather playing through his contract with Leafs affiliate, the Toronto Marlies.

On September 18, 2008, Brown was invited to the Philadelphia Flyers training camp but was later released on September 30, 2008. Brown instead started the 2008–09 season in the ECHL with the Fresno Falcons. He was given a tryout with the Quad City Flames of the AHL before he was signed by the Flames for the rest of the year on December 26, 2008.

Personal life
After hockey, Brown became an account executive in the consulting services department of Ottawa-based IT company Maplesoft. He is also president of the Maplesoft Hawks Hockey Organization. The program consists of boys and girls' spring AAA hockey teams as well as unique skill development camps and clinics that operate year-round.

Career statistics

See also
Captain (ice hockey)

References

External links

1975 births
Living people
Barrie Colts players
Buffalo Sabres players
Canadian ice hockey defencemen
Chicago Blackhawks players
Florida Everblades players
Fredericton Canadiens players
Fresno Falcons players
Hartford Wolf Pack players
Ice hockey people from Newfoundland and Labrador
Minnesota Wild players
Montreal Canadiens draft picks
Montreal Canadiens players
National Hockey League first-round draft picks
New York Rangers players
North Bay Centennials players
People from Newfoundland (island)
Quad City Flames players
Toronto Marlies players